The Merry-Go-Round (German: Der Reigen) is a 1920 German silent film directed by Richard Oswald and starring Asta Nielsen, Conrad Veidt and Eduard von Winterstein. It was adapted from the 1897 play, La Ronde by Arthur Schnitzler.

The film's sets were designed by the art director Hans Dreier.

Plot
Drama about Elena, a woman with a dubious past, who marries a shop keeper, Albert. When her former pimp, Peter shows up, her life is ruined. She shoots him and poisons herself.

Cast
 Asta Nielsen as Elena  
 Conrad Veidt as Petre Karvan  
 Eduard von Winterstein as Albert Peters  
 Irmgard Bern as Frau Peters  
 Theodor Loos as Fritz Peters  
 Loni Nest 
 Willi Schaeffers
 Ilse von Tasso-Lind as Mutter  
 Hugo Döblin 
 Willy Karin

Bibliography
 Grange, William. Cultural Chronicle of the Weimar Republic. Scarecrow Press, 2008.

External links

1920 films
Films based on works by Arthur Schnitzler
Films of the Weimar Republic
German silent feature films
Films directed by Richard Oswald
German films based on plays
Adultery in films
Films about prostitution in Germany
German black-and-white films